The men's triple jump event at the 1979 Summer Universiade was held at the Estadio Olimpico Universitario in Mexico City on 10 and 11 September 1979.

Medalists

Results

Qualification

Qualification mark: 16.00 m

Final

References

Athletics at the 1979 Summer Universiade
1979